Dean Stockwell was an American actor whose career spanned over 70 years. He began his career as a child actor, performing as a contract player for Metro-Goldwyn-Mayer. In the 1960s, he transitioned into adult roles, appearing in Sons and Lovers (1960) and Rapture (1965), followed by The Dunwich Horror (1970) and Dennis Hopper's The Last Movie (1971).

Stockwell had a career revival in the 1980s, appearing in Wim Wenders' acclaimed drama Paris, Texas (1984), followed by roles in David Lynch's films Dune (1984) and Blue Velvet (1986). In 1988, he received critical notice for his portrayal of Howard Hughes in Francis Ford Coppola's Tucker: The Man and His Dream, as well as his role in Jonathan Demme's Married to the Mob, for which he was nominated for an Academy Award for Best Supporting Actor. Stockwell subsequently appeared in Robert Altman's The Player (1992), and reunited with Coppola to appear in The Rainmaker (1997).

Film

Television

Stage

Radio

References

Male actor filmographies
American filmographies